Priest Tyron Thomas West (born July 29, 1974) is a German light heavyweight kickboxer, currently competing in Muay Thai. He is a former WMC European Muay Thai Champion, IKBF European Champion, IKBF World Champion K1 and WKA World Champion K1.

Fighting career
April 2003 Priest won in round three via TKO against Billy Cuba the IKBF German Title cruiser weight

October 2003 Priest won after five rounds by points against Christan Dinger (GER) the German MTBD / WMC Title super light heavy weight

September 2006 Priest won after five rounds the WMC European Title against Martin Kubes (CZ) super light heavy weight

West fought Clifton Brown(CND) for the World Muaythai Council (WMC) world super light heavyweight title on October 27, 2007. Priest have to give up in round one by knee injury.

On September 25, 2010 Priest West fought Marcin Tomczyk (Poland) at Fight Night Mannheim to determine the IKBF (K-1 Rules) European Championship at -82.55 kg. West won the title via K.O. in the 5th round.

In October 2011, Priest won against Eldad Levy (Israel) by points 5:0, earning the IKBF Worldtitel after five hard rounds.

On June 2, 2012, Priest faced Tomi Čolić from Croatia and won the WKA World title (K1) by Kick-Ko in round 3.

Titles
 2012 WKA World Champion K1
 2011 IKBF World Champion K1
 2010 IKBF European Champion K1
 2007 WMC Vize World Champion Muay Thai
 2003/2009 German Champion MTBD/WMC Muay Thai (Professionals)
 2006 WMC European Champion Muay Thai
 2006 IFMA Europa Windy Cup Winner Muay Thai
 2005 WMC Windy Muay Thai Super Cup Tournament (82 kg) finalist
 2003/2005/2006 Bronze Medal Winner IFMA World Championship
 2003 German Champion IKBF Kickboxing (Professionals)
 2003 Int. German Champion Amateur Muay Thai IFMA
 2002/2004 Int. Sowenia Champion IFMA
 2002 Vize - European Champion Amateur Muay Thai IMTF
 2001/2002 Int. German Champion Amateur Muay Thai IMTF
 2000/2001 Int. German Champion IKBF Kickboxing Amateurs
 2000 Int. Austrian Champion Amateur Muay Thai IMTF

Professional kickboxing record

|-
|-  bgcolor="#c5d2ea"
| 2013-09-28 || NC||align=left| Taylan Yesil || Apache Fight Night || Germany ||  NC  ||  || 
|-
! style=background:white colspan=9 |
|-
|-  bgcolor="FFBBBB"
| 2012-10-20 || Loss||align=left| Patric Kolbe ||  || Germany ||  TKO  || 2 || 
|-
|-  bgcolor="CCFFCC"
| 2012-09-01 || Win||align=left| Omar Armani || Mix Fight Gala Frankfurt || Frankfurt, Germany ||  Decision (Unanimous)  || 3 || 3:00
|-
|-  bgcolor="CCFFCC"
| 2012-06-02 || Win||align=left| Tomi Čolić ||  ||  ||  KO (Kick)  || 3 ||
|-
! style=background:white colspan=9 |
|-
|-  bgcolor="FFBBBB"
| 2011-11-19 || Loss||align=left| Filip Sykora || Souboj Titanu, Final || Czech Republic ||  TKO  || 1 || 
|-
! style=background:white colspan=9 |
|-
|-  bgcolor="CCFFCC"
| 2011-11-19 || Win||align=left| Jiri Kopencny || Souboj Titanu, Semi finals || Czech Republic ||  KO (Kick)  || 2 ||
|-  bgcolor="CCFFCC"
| 2011-10 || Win||align=left| Eldad Levy ||  ||  ||  Decision (Unanimous)  || 5 ||3:00 
|-
! style=background:white colspan=9 |
|-
|-  bgcolor="CCFFCC"
| 2010-11-20 || Win||align=left| Tarik Kuzucu || The Champions Club 5  || Bamberg, Germany ||  Decision (Unanimous)  || 3 ||3:00 
|-
|-  bgcolor="CCFFCC"
| 2010-10-07 || Win||align=left| Geronimo de Groot || Mix Fight Gala 10 ||  ||  KO  || 3 ||
|-
|-  bgcolor="CCFFCC"
| 2010-09-25 || Win ||align=left| Marcin Tomczyk || Fight Night Mannheim || Mannheim, Germany || KO || 5 || 
|-
! style=background:white colspan=9 |
|-
|-  bgcolor="FFBBBB"
| 2010-01-10 || Loss ||align=left| Mehmet Aksoy ||  ||  Adana, Turkey || TKO (Injury) || 1 ||
|-
|-  bgcolor="CCFFCC"
| 2009-12-05 || Win ||align=left| Marcello Adriaansz || Mix Fight Gala IX || Darmstadt, Germany || Ext. R. Decision || 4 || 3:00
|-
|-  bgcolor="FFBBBB"
| 2009-11-23 || Loss ||align=left| Jiri Zak ||  ||  || Decision (Split) || 3 || 3:00
|-
|-  bgcolor="CCFFCC"
| 2009-11-01 || Win ||align=left| Hakan Aksoy ||  ||  || TKO || 1 || 
|-
|-  bgcolor="CCFFCC"
| 2008-12-13 || Win ||align=left| Pierre Clasen || The Champions Club 2  || Bamberg, Germany || TKO ||  || 
|-
|-  bgcolor="FFBBBB"
| 2007-10-27 || Loss||align=left| Clifton Brown || WMC "The Champions Club" || Bamberg, Germany ||  TKO (Knee injury)  || 1 || 
|-
! style=background:white colspan=9 |
|-
|-  bgcolor="#FFBBBB"
| 2007-06-29 || Loss ||align=left| Attila Karacs || Fighting European Tour 2007, Semi Finals ||Martigues, France || TKO (injury) || 2 || 1:10
|-
|-  bgcolor="#CCFFCC"
| 2007-06-29 || Win||align=left| Marko Tomašević || Fighting European Tour 2007, Quarter Finals ||Martigues, France || Decision || 3 || 3:00
|-
|-
| colspan=9 | Legend:

References

External links
WAT - Kampfkunst Tempel Mannheim Official site

1974 births
Living people
German male kickboxers
Light heavyweight kickboxers
German Muay Thai practitioners
Sportspeople from Mannheim
German people of American descent